The 2010–11 Southeastern Conference men's basketball season began with practices on October 16, 2010 and ended with the SEC Tournament on March 10–13, 2011 at the Georgia Dome in Atlanta. The regular-season champion of the league and its East Division was Florida, with Alabama winning the West Division crown. Kentucky won the tournament crown and went on to make the Final Four of the NCAA tournament.

This was the last season for the SEC's two-division alignment in men's basketball. The league's head coaches voted at the league's annual meeting on June 1, 2011 to eliminate the divisional format, starting with the 2011–12 season.

Pre-season polls and teams
Pre-Season Poll:

Pre-Season All-SEC Teams

SEC Coaches select 8 players
Players in bold are choices for SEC Player of the Year

Rankings

Attendance

Post season

NCAA tournament

National Invitation Tournament

Awards and honors

All-Americans

All SEC teams and awards
The following individuals received postseason honors after having been chosen by the SEC coaches:

All-Academic

USBWA All-District team

References